The 2003 AF2 season was the fourth season of the AF2. It was preceded by 2002 and succeeded by 2004. The league champions were the Tulsa Talons, who defeated the Macon Knights in ArenaCup IV. For the first time ever, AF2 uses the six-division alignment (three divisions per conference).

League info

Standings

 Green indicates clinched playoff berth
 Purple indicates division champion
 Grey indicates best regular season record

Playoffs

ArenaCup IV

ArenaCup IV was the 2003 edition of the AF2's championship game, in which the National Conference Champions Tulsa Talons defeated the American Conference Champions Macon Knights in Tulsa, Oklahoma by a score of 58 to 40.

References

External links
 2003 af2 season
 Arena Cup IV stats

Af2 seasons